is the author of the internationally best-selling novel, Breasts and Eggs, a New York Times Notable Book of the Year and one of TIME’s Best 10 Books of 2020. 

Born in Osaka, Kawakami made her literary debut as a poet in 2006, and published her first novella, My Ego, My Teeth, and the World, in 2007. Her writing is known for its poetic qualities and its insights into the female body, ethical questions, and the dilemmas of modern society. 

Her works have been translated into many languages and are available all over the world. She has received numerous prestigious literary awards in Japan for her work, including the Akutagawa Prize, the Tanizaki Prize, and the Murasaki Shikibu Prize. 

She lives in Tokyo, Japan.

Career 
Kawakami worked as a bar hostess and bookstore clerk before embarking on a singing career. Kawakami released three albums and three singles as a singer, but quit her singing career in 2006 to focus on writing.

Before winning the Akutagawa Prize in 2008 for Chichi to ran, Kawakami was known in Japan primarily as a blogger. At its peak, her popular blog received over 200,000 hits per day.

Kawakami's first full-length novel, titled Hevun (Heaven), won the 2010 Murasaki Shikibu Prize for Literature. In 2012 an English translation of her short story "March Yarn" appeared in March was Made of Yarn, a collection of essays and stories about the 2011 Tōhoku earthquake and tsunami.

In 2016, she was selected as Granta Best of Young Japanese Novelists 2016 for her short story "Marie's Proof of Love".

From 2015 to 2017, Kawakami conducted a series of interviews with Haruki Murakami, in which she notably asked him about women and sexualization in his novels. The edited volume of these interviews, titled Mimizuku wa Tasogare ni Tobitatsu (Haruki Murakami: A Long, Long Interview) was published in 2017.

Mieko Kawakami's novel, Ms Ice Sandwich, made the shortlist of the 2018 edition of the Grand Prix of Literary Associations.

In 2019, Kawakami published Natsu monogatari(夏物語), a considerably expanded version of her novella Chichi to ran and received the 73rd Mainichi Publication Culture Award.

In 2020, Summer Stories, the English translation of Natsu monogatari, was published by Europa Editions and has attained high acclaim. The New York Times ran a review by Katie Kitamura on the day of publication in which she observes, "Mieko Kawakami writes with a bracing lack of sentimentality, particularly when describing the lives of women."

Her 2022 book, All the Lovers in the Night, was a finalist for the 2023 National Book Critics Circle Award in Fiction.

Writing style 
Kawakami's writing often employs Osaka-ben, a distinctive Japanese dialect spoken in Osaka and surrounding cities. She also incorporates experimental and poetic language into her short stories and novels, citing Lydia Davis and James Joyce as literary influences. Celebrated Japanese author Haruki Murakami called her his favorite young novelist and has described her writing as "ceaselessly growing and evolving."

Recognition 
 2007 Tsubouchi Shoyo Prize for Young Emerging Writers for Watakushi ritsuin hā, mata wa sekai (My Ego Ratio, My Teeth, and the World)
 2008 Chūya Nakahara Prize for Sentan de, sasuwa sasareruwa sora eewa
 2008 Akutagawa Prize for Chichi to ran (Breasts and Eggs)
 2010 Murasaki Shikibu Prize for Hevun (Heaven)
 2013 Tanizaki Prize for Ai no yume to ka (Dreams of Love, etc.)
 2016 Watanabe Junichiro Prize for Akogare (Yearning)
 2019 Mainichi Publication Culture Award for Natsu monogatari ("Summer Stories")

Bibliography

Books in Japanese 
 Watakushi ritsu in ha, mata wa sekai (わたくし率 イン 歯一、または世界, My Ego Ratio, My Teeth, and the World), Kodansha, 2007, 
 Chichi to ran (乳と卵, Breasts and Eggs), Bungeishunju, 2008, 
 Sentan de, sasuwa sasareruwa soraeewa(先端で、さすわ さされるわ そらええわ), Seidosha, 2008, 
 Hevun (ヘヴンHeaven), Kodansha, 2009, 
 Subete mayonaka no koibito tachi (すべて真夜中の恋人たち, All the Lovers in the Night）, Kodansha, 2011, 
 Ai no yume to ka (愛の夢とか, Dreams of Love, etc.), Kodansha, 2013, 
 Akogare (あこがれ, Yearning), Shinchosha, 2015 
 Wisteria to sannin no onna tachi (ウィステリアと三人の女たち, "Wisteria and Three Women"), Shinchosha, 2017, 
 Natsu monogatari (夏物語, "Summer Stories"), Bungeishunju, 2019, 
 Haru no kowai mono (春のこわいもの, "The Fears of Spring"), Shinchosha, 2022,

Selected work in English 
 "From Breasts and Eggs," trans. Louise Heal Kawai, Words Without Borders, 2012
 "March Yarn," trans. Michael Emmerich, March was Made of Yarn: Reflections on the Japanese Earthquake, Tsunami, and Nuclear Meltdown, 2012
 "Where Have All the Sundays Gone?", trans. Hitomi Yoshio, Words Without Borders, 2015
 "About Her and the Memories That Belong to Her," trans. Hitomi Yoshio, Granta 132, 2015
 "Strawberry Fields Forever and Ever," trans. Hitomi Yoshio, Pleiades: Literature in Context, 2016
 "The Flower Garden," trans. Hitomi Yoshio, Freeman's: The Future of New Writing, 2017
 Ms. Ice Sandwich, trans. Louise Heal Kawai, Pushkin Press, 2018, 
 "How Much Heart," trans. David Boyd, Granta Online, 2018
 Breasts and Eggs, trans. Sam Bett and David Boyd, Europa Editions, 2020, 
”The Flowers Look More Beautiful Now Than Ever,” trans. Hitomi Yoshio, Granta Online, 2020
”Shame,” trans. Louise Heal Kawai and Hitomi Yoshio, Granta Online, 2020
 Heaven, trans. Sam Bett and David Boyd, Europa Editions, 2021, pp.192. 
 All the Lovers in the Night, trans. Sam Bett and David Boyd, Europa Editions, 2022, pp.224.

References

External links
 J'Lit | Authors : Mieko Kawakami | Books from Japan 

1976 births
Living people
Japanese writers
Akutagawa Prize winners
Writers from Osaka
Musicians from Osaka
21st-century Japanese singers
21st-century Japanese women singers